Abhinav Kumar (born 7 November 1984) is an Indian former cricketer. He played twenty first-class matches for Hyderabad between 2005 and 2012. In November 2008, he became the first player for Hyderabad to score 99 not out in a Ranji Trophy match.

See also
 List of Hyderabad cricketers

References

External links
 

1984 births
Living people
Indian cricketers
Hyderabad cricketers
Cricketers from Hyderabad, India